Javed Akhtar (21 November 1940 – 8 July 2016) was a Pakistani cricketer who played in one Test in 1962. An off spinner, he had success at first-class level, taking his wickets at an average of 18.17, but struggled in his only Test, failing to take a wicket.

He later became an umpire, standing in 18 Tests and 40 ODIs from 1980 to 1999.

See also
 List of Test cricket umpires
 List of One Day International cricket umpires

References

1940 births
2016 deaths
Pakistan Test cricketers
Pakistani Test cricket umpires
Pakistani One Day International cricket umpires
Pakistani cricketers
Rawalpindi cricketers
Peshawar cricketers
Combined Services (Pakistan) cricketers
North Zone (Pakistan) cricketers
Cricketers from Delhi